The Albert Lea Public Library serves the City of Albert Lea, Minnesota and surrounding communities, and is a member of Southeastern Libraries Cooperating, the SE Minnesota library region.  Recently renovated in 2007, the library features a state of the art computer lab and 20 public access computers. Wi-Fi service is also available to patrons and guests.

The Children's Library features programs for infants and adolescents: Story Time, Nighttime Story Time and L.A.F. (Library Afternoon Fun).

Adult programming includes basic computer classes, one-on-one computer instruction, a Nonfiction Bookclub, a fiction book club, the "Fountain Lake Readers." and presentations by authors.

Art donated from local artists is on display throughout the entire library. A mural by artist Chandler Anderson is featured in the Children's Library.

The Albert Lea Public Library has been housed in the City Center building since 1968. A free public library has existed in the City of Albert Lea since 1899.

References

External links
GoogleMap to Library
Albert Lea Public Library
Online Catalog
Classics On-the-Go - ALPL's Podcast of Classic Children's Stories
ALPL Blog
Albert Lea Public Library Facebook page

Public libraries in Minnesota
Education in Freeborn County, Minnesota
Buildings and structures in Freeborn County, Minnesota
Southeastern Libraries Cooperating